Pardaugava Riga may refer to:

 FK Pārdaugava, Riga football club
 Dinamo Riga (original), Riga hockey club